WDNM-LD is a low-power television station operated by Word of God Fellowship, Inc. licensed in the Memphis, Tennessee area broadcasting on local digital channel UHF 22. Founded in 1995, it is owned by Daystar.

References

DNM-LD
Television channels and stations established in 1999
1999 establishments in Tennessee
Daystar (TV network) affiliates
Low-power television stations in the United States